Acacia clelandii, also known as umbrella mulga, is a shrub belonging to the genus Acacia and the subgenus Juliflorae that is native to arid parts of central Australia.

Description
It has yellow resinous ribbing on the branchlets that are covered in small white hairs. Like most species of Acacia it has phyllodes rather than true leaves. The terete to subterete evergreen phyllodes are sometimes flat, straight or slightly curved. Following flowering brown and straight seed pods with an oblong shape form.

Distribution
In Western Australia it has a limited and scattered distribution in the Pilbara and eastern Mid West regions where it is usually situated on dunes or rocky hills. It is also found in South Australia especially in the Gawler Range and the far north where the range of the shrub extends into adjoining parts of Western Australia and the Northern Territory.

See also
List of Acacia species

References

clelandii
Acacias of Western Australia
Plants described in 2001
Taxa named by Leslie Pedley
Flora of South Australia